Elachista bipunctella is a moth in the family Elachistidae. It was described by Sinev and Sruoga in 1995. It is found in south-eastern Siberia and Japan. The habitat consists of boggy areas.

The length of the forewings is about 3.7 mm. The forewings are white, margined with brownish grey on the basal 2/3 of the costa and with two small dark brown marks around the middle of the fold and around the tip of the cell. There are coppery brown scales scattered sparsely on the distal 1/4 of the wing. The hindwings are ochreous grey. There is probably one generation per year.

References

Moths described in 1995
bipunctella
Moths of Asia